Arti may refer to:

Companies and organizations
 Arti et Amicitiae, a Dutch artist's society in Amsterdam
 Arti Sacrum, a Dutch artists' society located in Rotterdam, Netherlands
 Arti, an alternative name for the Guilds of Florence
 ARTİ (Azərbaycan Respublikasının Təhsil İnstitutu), the Institute of Education of the Republic of Azerbaijan

Entertainment
 Aarti (film), a 1962 Indian Bollywood film
 Aarti Bajaj, Indian film editor
 Aarti Chhabria (born 1982), Indian actress and a former model
 Aarti Mann (born 1978), American actress in The Big Bang Theory
 Aarti Puri (born 8 January), also known as Arthi Puri, an Indian film and television actress
 Aarti Singh, Indian television actress

Places
 Arti, Russia, an urban locality in Sverdlovsk Oblast, Russia
 Arți, a village in Șugag Commune, Alba County, Romania
 Arti, a village in Aurangabad district, Bihar, India

Other uses
 Arti (Hinduism), a Hindu ritual of worship 
 Arthi (Balmiki), a similar ritual among the Balmiki
 Arti (given name), a feminine given name
 Acute respiratory tract infection

See also
 Aarthi (disambiguation)
 Arathi
 Artis (disambiguation)